In today's society every individual is overwhelmed by different types of media. Studying the decision making process has led to the Theories of Media Exposure.

Specific Theories

Uses and Gratifications Theory

One of the most popular theories, Uses and Gratifications Theory, is based on users actively attempting to satisfy their media needs. Elihu Katz is often credited with being one of the original creators of this theory. This theory states that an individual will choose the media or form of media that will satisfy their desires most completely. There are a number of different desires involved with this theory, such as a desire for information or social interaction. When seeking to fulfill these desires, an individual will need to make a decision. This decision making process if the primary interest for the theorists. When comparing social networking websites, it is simply a matter of preference at the time. However the decision making process becomes more convoluted when deciding between watching a movie, playing a game online, or reading a newspaper. The same fundamental principle applies however, the person will make the decision based on what brings the most gratification.

Social Learning Theory

Social Learning Theory, similar to Uses and Gratifications Theory, is based on the gratification of an individual, but differs in that it is based more on behaviour rather than decision making. Albert Bandura is said to be the forerunner of this theory. Each individual will make decisions based on anticipation. There is a heavy reliance on previous experience knowing what leads to gratification and what will not. If one receives joy from watching comedies, then an individual will seek out comedies in the future. If horror films leave a person with nightmares then they will most likely attempt to avoid them. This theory also states that the experience of others can be used in the decision making process. If a family member recommends a book then an individual is more likely to pick up the book and read it themselves. This theory does address more thoroughly media avoidance than does Uses and Gratifications Theory.

Cultivation Theory 
Cultivation theory was proposed by George Gerbner in the 1960s. This theory focuses on how the amount of television that is taken in impacts the watcher. Gerbner argued that the more television taken in by the viewer, the more their views of the world reflect what they are shown through the media. He compared his studies between two groups of people who were similar when it came to demographics, but the main difference between the groups was that one regularly watched television and the other did not. This theory focuses on the long-term effects of television and how the messages being portrayed can cultivate in people's lives. Gerbner believed that television has the ability to impact how people think about certain concepts but he did not believe that television has the ability to alter the concepts that people believe in. He states that people have preconceived notions about certain concepts and that they utilize the content viewed on television to build on these notions and confirm the truth of them.   Criticisms 
Gerbner's theory of cultivation has been criticized for being too simplistic. Certain critics believe that the major issue with this theory is that Gerbner does not take content differences into account. He also focused his studies mainly on the fictional side of television which is leaving out a large portion of the content shown on television. Another criticism related to this one is that it is somewhat inapplicable in the 21st century. Since this theory was originally adapted in the 1960s, the content that was shown while he conducted his studies differ greatly from the content shown in the year 2020.

References

External links
Uses and Gratifications Theory Video
Social Learning Theory Video

Mass media theories